Erpolzheim station is a railway station in the municipality of Erpolzheim, located in the district of Bad Dürkheim in Rhineland-Palatinate, Germany.

References

Railway stations in Rhineland-Palatinate
Buildings and structures in Bad Dürkheim (district)
Railway stations in Germany opened in 1873